The Moscovian is in the ICS geologic timescale a stage or age in the Pennsylvanian, the youngest subsystem of the Carboniferous. The Moscovian overlaps with the European regional Westphalian stage and the North American Atokan and Desmoinesian stages.

Name and definition
The Moscovian Stage was introduced by Sergei Nikitin (1850 - 1909) in 1890, using brachiopods in the Moscow Basin of European Russia. Nikitin named the stage after Moscow, then a major city and now the capital of Russia.

The base of the Moscovian is close to the first appearances of the conodonts Declinognathodus donetzianus and Idiognathoides postsulcatus or otherwise the fusulinid Aljutovella aljutovica. Because the fusulinid species are regionally different, they can not be used for worldwide correlation. A Global Boundary Stratotype Section and Point for the Moscovian Stage has yet to be defined (2008). A proposal is to use the first appearance of the conodont Diplognathodus ellesmerensis, but since the species is rare and its evolution relatively unknown, it has not been accepted yet.

The top of the Moscovian (base of the Kasimovian) is at the base of the fusulinid biozone of Obsoletes obsoletes and Protriticites pseudomontiparus, or with the first appearance of the ammonite genus Parashumardites.

Subdivisions
In European Russia and Eastern Europe, where the stage was first recognized, the Moscovian is subdivided into four regional substages: Vereiskian, Kashirskian, Podolskian, and Myachkovskian, named after towns near Moscow (Vereya, Kashira, Podolsk, and Myachkovo).

The Moscovian can biostratigraphically be divided into five conodont biozones:
 Neognathodus roundyi and Streptognathodus cancellosus Zone
 Neognathodus medexultimus and Streptognathodus concinnus Zone
 Streptognathodus dissectus Zone
 Neognathodus uralicus Zone
 Declinognathodus donetzianus Zone

References

External links
Carboniferous timescale at the website of the Norwegian network of offshore records of geology and stratigraphy
Moscovian, Geowhen Database

 
Pennsylvanian geochronology
Geological ages